Eucalyptus subangusta is a species of tree, mallee or mallet that is endemic to the southwest of Western Australia. It has smooth bark, narrow lance-shaped leaves, flower buds in groups of up to nineteen, white flowers and cup-shaped to barrel-shaped fruit.

Description
Flowering occurs in most months and the flowers are white.

Taxonomy and naming
Eucalyptus redunca var. subangusta was first formally described in 1934 by William Blakely in his book A Key to the Eucalypts from specimens collected by William Vincent Fitzgerald near Cunderdin. In 1991, Ian Brooker and Stephen Hopper raised the variety to species status as Eucalyptus subangusta in the journal Nuytsia. In the same publication, Brooker and Hopper described four subspecies and the names have been accepted by the Australian Plant Census:
 Eucalyptus subangusta subsp. cerina Brooker & Hopper has glaucous seedlings, white, waxy branchlets and a longer, narrower conical operculum;
 Eucalyptus subangusta subsp. pusilla Brooker & Hopper is sometimes a mallet and has dull green leaves and the smallest buds and fruit;
 Eucalyptus subangusta (Blakely) Brooker & Hopper subsp. subangusta is a mallee with non-waxy branchlets, dull green leaves and relatively large buds and fruit;
 Eucalyptus subangusta subsp. virescens Brooker & Hopper has glossy, light green leaves.

Distribution and habitat
Subspecies cerina grows in low woodland, mallee and shrubland in the eastern central wheatbelt between Yelbeni to east of Southern Cross. Subspecies pusilla grows in fine textured, stony soils in the northern wheatbelt, between Wongan Hills, Mullewa and Paynes Find. Subspecies subangusta grows on sandplains and hills, usually on yellow or red sand in low to tall mallee. It is the most widespread and abundant of the four and occurs in the central and northern wheatbelts from north of Kalbarri to south-east of Norseman. Subspecies virescens is only known a few scattered locations in the eastern part of the central wheatbelt between Manmanning and Watheroo.

Conservation status
This eucalypt species and three of its subspecies are classified as "not threatened" by the Western Australian Government Department of Parks and Wildlife but subspecies virescens is classified as "Priority Three" meaning that it is poorly known and known from only a few locations but is not under imminent threat.

See also
List of Eucalyptus species

References

Eucalypts of Western Australia
subangusta
Myrtales of Australia
Plants described in 1934
Taxa named by Ian Brooker
Taxa named by Stephen Hopper